The  Cité de l'espace (French for Space City) is a scientific discovery centre in France focused on spaceflight. It was opened in June 1997 and is located on the eastern outskirts of Toulouse. , there had been more than four million visitors.

Exhibits and installations
One can visit full-scale models of the Ariane 5 rocket, Mir, and Soyuz modules. The original planetarium has 140 seats and presents shows throughout the day. Cité de l'espace also has numerous exhibits, often interactive; for example, a mock-up of a control room near the model of Ariane 5, allows visitors to prepare the launching of a rocket, help with its flight and then place a satellite in orbit. Terr@dome (a terrestrial half-sphere  in diameter) presents the history of space from the Big-bang to the Solar System. A building named Astralia, which opened in 2005, includes: a 280-seat planetarium, called the Stellarium, equipped with a hemispherical screen  in area; a 300-seat IMAX cinema, which shows the film Hubble 3D (previously Space Station 3D, a 3D film made on board the International Space Station); and conference rooms.

History

1994 to 1997 : Development of the Cité de l'espace spearheaded by Jean-Michel Oberto, the founding director of the park 
June 1997 : Opening of the Cité de l'espace by Dominique Baudis, Representant-Mayor of Toulouse, and Claudie Haigneré, spationaut and godmother of the park.
July 1998 : Opening of the  full scale Mir.
September 2000 : The millionth visitor is welcomed to the Cité.
October 2000 : Opening of the Terr@dome.
October 2002 : Opening of a permanent exhibition hall about Mars.
July 2003 : Start point of the 13th stage of the Tour de France.
October 2003 : The Cité de l'espace is officially designated a "Tourisme et Handicap" site for the four types of handicap (mental, visual, motor, hearing).
April 2005 : Opening of "Astralia - le 6ème continent", (the 6th continent), notably housing the planetarium and the IMAX cinema.
May 2006 : Opening of an area for children, "la Base des Enfants".

Some figures
 200,000 visitors in 2004
 Park area: 
  of exhibition space

External links

Museums in Toulouse
Spaceflight
Science museums in France
Amusement parks in France
Tourist attractions in Haute-Garonne
1997 establishments in France
Amusement parks opened in 1997